Alper Mehmet  (born 28 August 1948) is a British former diplomat and one of the United Kingdom's first two ethnic minority ambassadors, along with Anwar Choudhury.

Early life
Mehmet arrived in the United Kingdom from Cyprus in 1956 when he was aged eight, as a British citizen but unable to speak English. Mehmet was educated at Parmiter's School near London, and at Bristol Polytechnic (now the University of the West of England).

Career
On graduation from Bristol, Mehmet became an immigration officer (1970–79) and then an entry clearance officer in Lagos, Nigeria (1979–83). In 1983, he entered Her Majesty's Diplomatic Service, serving in Romania, Germany and Iceland (twice) and leaving in 2008. When Mehmet was appointed as Ambassador to Iceland in 2004, he became one of the first two British ambassadors from ethnic minority backgrounds to be appointed (the other being Anwar Choudhury, who was appointed High Commissioner to Bangladesh). Mehmet became Chairman of MigrationWatch UK in July 2019.

Honours
Mehmet was appointed a Member of the Royal Victorian Order on 26 June 1990.

References
MEHMET, Alper, Who's Who 2013, A & C Black, 2013; online edn, Oxford University Press, Dec 2012

1948 births
Living people
Cypriot emigrants to England
English people of Turkish Cypriot descent
Alumni of the University of the West of England, Bristol
Ambassadors of the United Kingdom to Iceland
People educated at Parmiter's School, London
Members of HM Diplomatic Service
Members of the Royal Victorian Order
20th-century British diplomats
21st-century British diplomats